Carmel (pronounced ) is a town in Putnam County, New York, United States.  As of the 2020 United States census, the town had a population of 33,576.  The town may have been named after Mount Carmel in Israel.

It has no incorporated villages, although the hamlets of Carmel and Mahopac each have populations sizable enough to be considered villages.

History

The town was settled around 1740 by George Hughson. On the night of April 26, 1777, after learning the news that the British had begun burning nearby Danbury, Connecticut, sixteen-year-old Sybil Ludington rode the entire night through the hamlets of Carmel, Mahopac, Kent Cliffs and Farmers Mills, warning those along the way that the British were coming before returning home at dawn.  A statue memorializing the ride  sits alongside Lake Gleneida.

Carmel was formed with Franklin town from part of Frederick town on March 17, 1795, while still a part of Dutchess County. (Franklin was renamed Patterson April 6, 1808. Frederick changed its name to Kent April 15, 1817.) Carmel was transferred to Putnam County when Dutchess County was split to form Putnam County in 1812 and Carmel was designated the county seat.  In 1861, a small part of Carmel was taken to be added to the town of Putnam Valley.

Putnam County Courthouse
The Putnam County Courthouse was built in 1814.  It is the second oldest working courthouse in New York State. General James Townsend, of Carmel, was the architect.  A landmark on Gleneida Avenue in Carmel, the building has a classical front facade. There was one hanging there in 1844. A jail was added in 1855. A new Putnam County Courthouse was completed in early 2008, located nearby on Gleneida Avenue.

Significant events
 December 4, 1965 – A Trans World Airlines Boeing 707 plane en route to San Francisco collided with an Eastern Airlines Constellation flight in mid-air, killing four people.
 October 22, 1974 - A large row of businesses on Gleneida Avenue was destroyed in a fire that required over 200 volunteer firefighters to fight the blaze.
 September 1982 – June 1983 – Carmel High School Boys Track star Mike Stahr was ranked first in the US for the mile run, losing only one high school track race during his junior and senior year. He set state records and was the Millrose Games mile winner two years in a row.
 September 11, 2001 – eight Carmel residents died in the September 11 terrorist attacks: Police Officer Stephen Patrick Driscoll, Firefighter Daniel Harlin, Firefighter Thomas Joseph Kuveikis, Firefighter Robert Minara, George Paris of Cantor Fitzgerald, Firefighter Christopher Blackwell, David Fodor of Fiduciary Trust, and Firefighter George Cain.  The town has a memorial dedicated at Spain-Cornerstone Park on the corner of Fair Street and Route 52.
 April 27–28, 2007 – The Town of Carmel hosted a two-day Revolutionary War era militia encampment along Lake Gleneida.  The event celebrated the 230th anniversary of the heroism of Sybil Ludington.

Government
Carmel is governed by a Town Supervisor and the Town Board. The Carmel Town Hall is located at 60 McAlpin Avenue in Mahopac.

Emergency services
Law enforcement is primarily handled by the Town of Carmel Police Department, supplemented by the Putnam County Sheriff's Office and the New York State Police.

Fire protection services are provided by the Carmel Fire Department, Croton Falls Fire District, Mahopac Volunteer Fire Department, and Mahopac Falls Volunteer Fire Department.

Emergency medical services are provided to the town based on nature and location of emergency. Basic life support ambulance service is provided by Carmel Volunteer Ambulance Corps, Mahopac Volunteer Fire Department, Mahopac Falls Volunteer Fire Department, and North Salem Volunteer Ambulance Corps. Advanced life support ambulance and first response service is provided by EMStar Ambulance under contract by Putnam County Bureau of Emergency Services.

Education
The Town of Carmel is served primarily by two school districts:

Carmel Central School District
Carmel Central School District encompasses 85 square miles and serves approximately 5000 students from six different towns. The district enrolls students from the town of Kent, as well as parts of the towns of Carmel, Putnam Valley, Patterson, Southeast and East Fishkill.

George Fischer Middle School is Carmel's primary middle school. Built in 1963, it was named after a former school board member, George F. Fischer. It contains a large number of students (1,000+), and contains grades 5–8. It is notable for its music program.

Constructed in 1929, Carmel High School, which serves 1,843 students, is located on Fair Street across the street from the post office in the heart of town. The original building had four additions, including one built in 1936 with money from the New Deal, one in 1969, one in 1980, and one in 2007, which holds science classrooms and a library.

St. James the Apostle is a Catholic elementary school in Carmel that opened in 1954.

Mahopac Central School District
Mahopac Central School District has 6 public schools serving 4,138 students in Mahopac, New York.

It is divided into five schools: three K-5 schools (Lakeview Elementary School, Fulmar Road Elementary School, and Austin Road Elementary School), a middle school for grades 6-8 (Mahopac Middle School) and a high school for grades 9-12 (Mahopac High School). A nursery school is operated by the district at the Mahopac Falls school.

Historically, Mahopac had five one-room school houses that were united into one central school (now Lakeview Elementary School) in 1935.

St. John the Evangelist was a Catholic elementary school in Mahopac from 1955 until its closing in 2011. The school building remains with the active Church across the street from Lake Mahopac.

Geography

The southern town line is the border of Westchester County, near Somers and Katonah.

Notable sites and organizations
 Gilead Cemetery 
 Putnam Hospital Center — a 164-bed not-for-profit acute care hospital on Stoneleigh Avenue, which opened in 1964.
 Reed Memorial Library

Communities and locations in Carmel
Boyds Corners-
 Carmel – A hamlet in the northeastern corner of the town and home to the seat of Putnam County.
Baldwin Place – A hamlet at the junction of US 6 and NY 118.
 Carmel Hills – A hamlet south of Carmel village.
 Crafts – once a hamlet of Carmel with its own post office, off Drewville Road, south of Route 6, named after the Craft Family, descendants of Pilgrims.
 Field Corners –
 Hopkins Corners –
 Houseman Corners –
 Kent-
 Kent Cliffs-
 Lake Carmel-
 Ludington -
 Mahopac – A hamlet in the southern half the town where the municipal government is located.
 Mahopac Falls – A hamlet in the southwestern corner of the town.
 Mahopac Mines – Abandoned mines on the eastern side of town near the old Ames building.
 Mahopac Point – A former private community on Lake Mahopac
Mahopac Golf Club – Located on the north side of Lake Mahopac is an 18-hole private golf and beach club.
 Rock Hill Camp – A Girl Scout camp opened in 1922, located in Mahopac on Long Pond.
 The Sedgewood Club – (Previously the Carmel Country Club)  A private community with golf and tennis facilities near the hamlet of Carmel,
 Thompkins Corners — 
 Secor Corners –
 Seven Hills — 
 Stillwater – A hamlet in the southwestern corner of the town.
 Tilly Foster – A hamlet southeast of Carmel village near the eastern town line.

Demographics

 Total Population: 33,196
 Males, 49.0%; Females – 51.0%
 Median Age: 40.1 years
 By Race
 White, 90.5%
 Hispanic (of any race), 8.0%
 Asian, 3.0%
 Black or African American, 1.0%
 Other Race, 2.7%
 Average Household Size: 2.99
 Median Household Income: $105,406 (2015)
 Per Capita Income: $42,034 (2015)
 High School Graduation Rate: 94.1%
 College Graduation Rate: 42.1%
Source: US Census

Notable people
 Lewis Ludington, (1786-1857), businessman, lumber baron, and real estate developer.
 Daniel Drew, (1797-1879), businessman, developer and financier
 William Francis Bailey, (1842-1915), Wisconsin politician and judge	
 Amedee J. Van Beuren, (1879-1938), film producer
 Daniel Gutman (1901-1993), lawyer, state senator, state assemblyman, president justice of the municipal court, and law school dean.
 Lou Albano,"Captain Lou" (1933-2009), professional wrestler/manager
 Larry Laoretti, (born 1939), professional golfer
 Jim Ryan, (born 1939) former Good Day New York anchor
 Bob May, (1939-2009) actor and stuntman, best remembered for playing The Robot on the 1965-68 television series Lost in Space	
 Leo Burmester, (1944-2007), stage and television actor
 Nancy Allen, (born 1950), classical harpist
 Dave Fleming, “Mr. Mahopac", (born 1969), professional baseball pitcher
 Ryan Kelly (born 1991), professional basketball player for the Houston Rockets	
 Sabrina Vega (born 1995), USA Gymnastics Senior National Team member
 Caleb McLaughlin, (born 2001), actor, star of Stranger Things

References

External links

 Town of Carmel official website
 Greater Mahopac-Carmel Chamber of Commerce
 History of Carmel, NY
 Reed Memorial Library (Carmel)

Towns in Putnam County, New York
Towns in the New York metropolitan area